Lune Rouge is the third studio album by American producer Tokimonsta. It was released on October 6, 2017, via Young Art Records. Produced by Tokimonsta, it features vocals of artists such as MNDR, Selah Sue, and Isaiah Rashad. In December 2018, the album was nominated for Best Dance/Electronic Album at the 61st Annual Grammy Awards.

Singles 
The album consists of five singles released in the span of five months between June to October 2017. The first single "Don't Call Me" was released on June 16, 2017. The second and third singles, "We Love" and "Bibimbap", were released on August 4 and 18 respectively. "No Way", the fourth single, was released on September 8, 2017. The album's fifth and final single was released on October 6, 2017, titled "I Wish I Could".

Background 
At the end of 2015, Tokimonsta was diagnosed with a rare and potentially fatal brain disease known as moyamoya. Having undergone two brain surgeries, she was left unable to speak. After taking a break from music production, her memory returned and she began production and writing for the album.

On April 6, 2018, the album's remix edition, titled Lune Rouge Remixed, was released via Young Art. Felix Cartal, Hugo Massien, Qrion, Sofi Tukker, Alexander Lewis, Kingdom and Dâm-Funk are among the featured artists included on the album. Tokimonsta told New York Daily News regarding the album "It represents who I am right now as an artist, how I've progressed over the many years that have passed since the last one."

Critical reception 

Pitchfork described Lune Rouge as having "a pleasantly everyday quality" and converting Tokimonsta's initial musical style into "streamlined pop compositions". Giving the album a 6.8 out of 10 rating, the website also noted her lack of effort in reflecting her recent struggles into the album's sound. PopMatters reviewed the album as "an ambitious assembly of every disparate tool... and a resounding success," rating it with 9 stars out of 10.

Track listing

Personnel 
 James Bautista – layout
 Shawn Hatfield – mastering
 Lewis Kunstler – executive production
 Jennifer "Tokimonsta" Lee – mixing, production
 Max Prentis – artwork

References

External links 
 
 

2017 albums
Electronic albums by American artists
Self-released albums